Achmad Kurniawan (31 October 1979 – 10 January 2017) was an Indonesian footballer, who played for Arema Cronus in the Indonesia Super League as a goal keeper. He is also the older brother of goal keeper Kurnia Meiga.

On 29 December 2016, Kurniawan was treated in an intensive care unit following a heart attack and going into a coma. Kurniawan later died at the Saiful Anwar hospital Malang, Indonesia on 10 January 2017, aged 37.

Honours

Club honors
Arema 
Copa Indonesia (1): 2006
East Java Governor Cup (1): 2013
Menpora Cup (1): 2013
Indonesian Inter Island Cup (1): 2014/15

Persik Kediri
East Java Governor Cup (1): 2008

References

External links
 Profile Ahmad Kurniawan

1979 births
2017 deaths
Betawi people
Indonesian footballers
Persita Tangerang players
Arema F.C. players
Persik Kediri players
Semen Padang F.C. players
Liga 1 (Indonesia) players
Indonesian Premier League players
Indonesian Premier Division players
Sportspeople from Jakarta
Association football goalkeepers
20th-century Indonesian people
21st-century Indonesian people